The 1989 Wyoming Cowboys football team represented the University of Wyoming in the 1989 NCAA Division I-A football season. It was the Cowboys' 94th season and they competed as a member of the Western Athletic Conference (WAC). The team was led by head coach Paul Roach, in his third year, and played their home games at War Memorial Stadium in Laramie, Wyoming. They finished with a record of five wins and six losses (5–6, 5–3 WAC).The Cowboys offense scored 357 points, while the defense allowed 329 points.

Schedule

Reference:

Team players in the NFL
The following were selected in the 1990 NFL Draft.

Reference:

References

Wyoming
Wyoming Cowboys football seasons
Wyoming Cowboys football